Surakarta is a little-known Indonesian strategy board game for two players, named after the ancient city of Surakarta in central Java. The game features an unusual method of capture which is "possibly unique" and "not known to exist in any other recorded board game". Little is known about its history.

The name of the game in the Indonesian language is permainan, which simply translates as "the game". In Java, the game is also called dam-daman. It was first published in France in 1970 as "Surakarta". The game is called "Roundabouts" in Sid Sackson's The Book of Classic Board Games.

Equipment

Traditional Indonesian game pieces are shells versus pebbles or stones, with the board grid inscribed in sand or volcanic ash. But any easily distinguished sets of pieces may be used (e.g.  distinguished by colour, as shown). Players begin the game with 12 pieces each.

Rules
Players decide who moves first, then turns alternate. The object of the game is to capture all 12 of the opponent's pieces; or, if no further captures are possible, to have more pieces remaining  than the opponent.

Pieces always rest on the points of intersection of the board's grid lines. On a turn, a player either moves one of their pieces a single step in any direction (forwards, backwards, sideways, or diagonally) to an unoccupied point, or makes a capturing move special to Surakarta.

Capturing move
A capturing move consists of traversing along an inner or outer circuit (coloured blue and green in the diagram, but red and blue in the photo) around at least one of the eight corner loops of the board, followed by landing on an enemy piece,  it. Captured pieces are removed from the game.

Corner loops are used only when making a capture. The capturing piece enters and leaves the circular loop via a grid line tangent to the circle. Any number of unoccupied points may be travelled over, before or after traversing a loop. An unoccupied point may be travelled over more than once during the capturing piece's journey. Only unoccupied points may be travelled over; jumping over pieces is not permitted.

Capturing is always optional (never mandatory).

End of game
A game is won when a player captures all 12 of the opponent's pieces. If neither side can make headway, the game is ended by agreement and the winner is the player with the greater number of pieces in play.

Scoring
A match consists of more than one game. Players agree beforehand how the winner will be determined. A couple of methods are typically used:
 Playing a fixed number of games: Each game is scored by the number of pieces in play at the end of the game. The winner is the player with higher total points after all games have finished.
 Playing to a fixed number of points: New games are played until one player reaches or exceeds the winning point total.

Strategy
In general, pieces are more powerful toward the centre of the board, where they are in one or two sets of loops. Pieces on the corner, on the other hand, are easy to trap, as the spaces next to the corner can be attacked in a number of directions.

Computer opponents
Surakarta is one of the games played regularly at the annual Computer Olympiad.

Variants

Surakarta variants are also played in rural China and Korea, with slightly different rules and boards. In these variants, pieces cannot step diagonally, and can slide along the outer circuit without capturing a piece.

A 7x7 grid variant with 14 pieces for each player is played in Yogyakarta, Java, Indonesia and is called Bas-basan sepur.  Whereas the game Surakarta is smaller with a 6x6 grid and only 12 pieces, but both games have the two capturing circuits (inner and outer circuits), and employ the same rules.  Bas-basan sepur today is rarely known in Yogyakarta with only 5.6% of participants in one 2016 survey showing knowledge of the game.    Back in the 1980s the game was played often in some areas of Yogyakarta (such at the Imogiri and Bantul areas).

Notes

References

Bibliography

External links

 Surakarta printable board https://sites.google.com/view/cavegames-surakarta/home

Surakarta for Android
Khamadi et al, Perancangan Konsep Adaptasi Permainan Tradisional Bas-Basan Sepur Dalam Permainan Digital "Amukti Palapa"

Abstract strategy games
Traditional board games
Indonesian inventions
Indonesian traditional games